The 2001–02 Scottish League Cup final was played on 17 March 2002 at Hampden Park in Glasgow and was the final of the 55th Scottish League Cup. The final was contested by Ayr United and Rangers, and was Ayr's first appearance in a national final. Rangers won the match 4–0, thanks to goals from Tore Andre Flo, a penalty from Barry Ferguson and a double from Claudio Caniggia.

Match details

2002
League Cup Final
Scottish League Cup Final 2002
Scottish League Cup Final 2002
2000s in Glasgow